A Spanish Colombian is a Colombian of Spanish descent. Since the vast majority of Colombians are of at least partial Spanish descent and their culture is predominantly derived from Spain, it is a rarely used term and Spanish-Colombians identify as such.

History 
The Spanish arrived in Colombia in 1499 to conquer the land. They built several settlements in territories of the Chibcha Confederation and placed a new order of the territory according to the interests of each group conqueror. This ordinance responded to resources that were in the settlements, a process which is generally not taken into account the views of the people who lived there. These establishments continued for the next three centuries with an expansion and colonial warrior, besides introducing a large number of black African population as slave labor, progress on indigenous peoples and palenqueros that newspapers were subject to displacement.
In 1499 the Spanish explorer Alonso de Ojeda arrived on the coast of northern Colombia (Cabo de la Vela). In 1501 Rodrigo de Bastidas crossed the coast between Cartagena de Indias and La Guajira and Magdalena River discovered. In 1510 Alonso de Ojeda founded San Sebastián de Urabá, the first Spanish settlement on the mainland, but that same year its provisional ruler, Francisco Pizarro, decided to leave and moved to a site in the Gulf of Urabá and founded under the direction of Martín Fernández de Enciso to Santa María la Antigua del Darién. This city, the capital of the first Spanish governor in the Castilla del Oro, was in turn abandoned in 1517. With Santa Marta (1525) and Cartagena (1533), established the Spanish control of the coast. The conquistador Gonzalo Jimenez de Quesada entered a vast area in the central region of Cundinamarca and Boyacá, conquering the powerful Chibcha culture, founding the city of Santa Fe de Bogota, Tunja ordering founding Gonzalo Suarez Rendon and naming the New Kingdom of Granada region.

To establish a civil government in New Granada created a Real Audiencia in Santa Fe de Bogota in 1548-1549. The Royal Court was a body that combined executive and judicial authority until the establishment of a presidency or governorship in 1564 assuming executive powers. Until 1550 the territory of Colombia was formed by the governors of Santa Marta and Cartagena, which were subject to the Audiencia of Santo Domingo, and Popayan that was subject to the viceroyalty of Peru. The jurisdiction of the Real Audiencia de Santa Fe de Bogotá include these governorates since 1550 and was extended in time over the surrounding provinces that were forming around the country corresponding to the New Granada.

In 1717 Santa Fe de Bogotá would become the capital of the Viceroyalty of New Granada, although suspended in 1724 due to financial problems, was reinstated in 1740 and continued until the loss of Spanish power over the territories in the 1810s.

The paisas have been considered an isolated population, and therefore different. They are mostly of Spanish descent, because Spanish men who settled in the region during the 16th and 17th centuries were accompanied by their wives. The mountains isolated the population until the late 19th century, when Antioquia entered the industrial revolution.

During the Spanish Civil War, thousands of Spaniards fled from Spain to Colombia. Over the course of General Francisco Franco's dictatorship many thousands more fled in fear of the regime. The Spanish republicans fled Franco's regime as well, seeking to escape retribution from the new government.

See also 
Colombia–Spain relations
White Colombians

References 

 
 
Spanish diaspora in South America
Colombia
Ethnic groups in Colombia
European Colombian